Hvidt is a Danish surname derived from hvid, meaning "white". 

Notable people bearing the surname Hvidt include:

Benjamin Hvidt (born 2000), Danish footballer 
Kasper Hvidt (born 1976), Danish handball player
Lauritz Nicolai Hvidt (1777–1856), Danish merchant and politician 
Peter Hvidt (1916–1986), Danish architect and furniture designer, co-founder of Hvidt & Mølgaard

Danish-language surnames